Kenogami Lake Station is an unincorporated place and railway point in the Unorganized West Part of Timiskaming District in northwestern Ontario, Canada. It is located on the Blanche River in the Saint Lawrence River drainage basin.

Transportation
Kenogami Lake Station is the eastern terminus of Ontario Highway 568 that heads  to its western terminus at Kenogami Lake on Ontario Highway 11 (at this point part of the Trans-Canada Highway), north of that highway's junction with Ontario Highway 66.

Kenogami Lake Station is on the Ontario Northland Railway main line, between Goldthorpe to the north and Swastika to the east, and is passed but not served by Northlander trains. It was formerly a train station on the line.

References

Communities in Timiskaming District